The 1999 WTA German Open singles  was the singles event of the fifty-fifth edition of the tennis tournament played at Berlin, Germany, the most prestigious tennis tournament in Central Europe. It was the sixth WTA Tier I tournament of the year, and part of the European claycourt season. Conchita Martínez was the defending champion; Martínez lost in the third round to Arantxa Sánchez Vicario.

World No. 1 Martina Hingis won in the final 6–0, 6–1 against the unseeded Julie Halard-Decugis.

Seeds
The top eight seeds received a bye to the second round.

Draw

Finals

Top half

Section 1

Section 2

Bottom half

Section 3

Section 4

Qualifying

Seeds

Qualifiers

Lucky losers

Qualifying draw

First qualifier

Second qualifier

Third qualifier

Fourth qualifier

Fifth qualifier

Sixth qualifier

Seventh qualifier

Eighth qualifier

References
 1999 WTA German Open Draw

WTA German Open
WTA German Open